Shanta Meena, credited as Aishwariyaa Bhaskaran, is an Indian actress who has acted in Tamil, Malayalam, Kannada and Telugu movies and along with several Malayalam and Tamil television soap operas. She is the daughter of actress Lakshmi.

Career

Aishwariyaa's first film was Oliyampukal (1991), followed by Mamagaru (1991), Rasukutty (1992) and Meera (1992). She played a double role in Butterflies (1993) and also in Gardish (1993), which was a remake of the Malayalam movie Kireedam. Early in her career, she turned down opportunity to work with Mani Ratnam in Thiruda Thiruda (1993).

Following her marriage in 1994, Aishwariyaa quit the film industry and chose to prioritise bringing up a family. However her marriage fell apart and she became addicted to taking drugs as a result of her husband's addiction, which made it difficult for her to re-enter the film industry after her divorce in 1996. After undergoing a rehabilitation process, she chose to continue her education in computer science and joined to work with the NIIT in 1997 and prioritised her work as a software engineer. She then accepted an offer to be a part of a television show produced by Suresh Chandra Menon, after being convinced by her friend, actress Revathi. After a four-year sabbatical from films as a result of her marriage, childbirth and divorce, Aishwariyaa made a comeback in R. Parthiban's Housefull (1999) portraying an inspector-in-charge of the bomb disposal squad. She continued to portray supporting roles in films such as Suyamvaram (1999), Sathyameva Jayathe (2000) and Narasimham (2000) during the turn of the century.

Personal life

Born as Shanta Meena to Bhaskaran and actress Lakshmi, she has a step sister from her mother's third marriage with Sivachandran.

She was married to Tanveer Ahmed in 1994 and they were divorced in 1996. The couple have a daughter born in 1995.

Filmography

Television

Serials

Shows

Web series

References

External links
 
 Aishu's Kitchen on Facebook
 Aishu's Kitchen – Portal

Actresses in Tamil cinema
20th-century Indian actresses
21st-century Indian actresses
Actresses in Telugu cinema
Indian film actresses
Living people
Actresses in Malayalam cinema
Actresses from Chennai
Actresses in Hindi cinema
Actresses in Kannada cinema
Indian television actresses
Actresses in Tamil television
Actresses in Malayalam television
Actresses in Telugu television
Year of birth missing (living people)